Raymond Serra (born Aurelio Lacagnina; August 13, 1936 – June 20, 2003) was an American character actor known for his many supporting roles in film and television over a 30-year career. He and his wife, Gayle, had four children.

Select filmography

Films

 The Gambler (1974) - Benny Minor Character
 The Switch or How to Alter Your Ego (1974) - Ralph White Major Character
 Dog Day Afternoon (1975) - New York Plainclothes Cop (uncredited)
 Marathon Man (1976) - Truck Driver
 The Death Collector (1976) - Doctor
 Hooch (1977)
 Contract on Cherry Street (1977) - Jimmy Monks
 Voices (1979) - Track Regular
 Manhattan (1979) - Pizzeria Waiter 
 Fighting Back (1980) - Tony Parisi
 Bolero (1981)
 Arthur (1981) - Racetrack Owner
 Wolfen (1981) - Detective 
 Bill (1981) - Harry
 Splitz (1982) - Vito Napoliani
 Vigilante (1982) - Court Officer
 Alphabet City (1984) - Gino
 The Purple Rose of Cairo (1985) - Hollywood Executive
 Prizzi's Honor (1985) - Bocca
 Stone Pillow (1985) - Stan
 Forever, Lulu (1987) - Alphonse
 La vallée fantôme (1987) - Le père de Dara
 A Time to Remember (1987) - Frank Villano
 Alone in the Neon Jungle (1988) - Sgt. Sal Ruby
 Teenage Mutant Ninja Turtles (1990) - Chief Sterns
 Teenage Mutant Ninja Turtles II: The Secret of the Ooze (1991) - Chief Sterns
 Sugar Hill (1993) - Sal Marconi
 The Silence of the Hams (1994) - Agent Prostitute #1
 Gotti (1996) - Frank LoCascio
 Safe Men (1998) - Barber
 Shepherd (1998) - Father Rizzo
 Men of Means (1998) - Tommy C.
 18 Shades of Dust (1999) - Goon #3
 Wannabes (2000) - Uncle Tommy 
 Mafioso: The Father, the Son (2001) - Don Salvatore
 Dead Canaries (2003) - Sammy Caso
 Mail Order Bride (2003) - Robber
 Our Italian Husband (2004) - Copy Shop Owner 
 Hot Ice, No-one Is Safe (2010) - Charlie the Bullet (final film role)

Television
 The Practice (1976)
 The Edge of Night (1956) - Eddie Lorimar (1982) 
 Mary Hartman, Mary Hartman (1976) - Joe Sweeney
 Kojak (1977) - Al Gregorio
 Love, Sidney (1982) - John
 Powerhouse (1982) - Lt. Al Gambrino
 Archie Bunker's Place (1983) - Marty Marquetti
 Spenser: For Hire (1986) - Joe Broz
 American Playhouse (1984-1986) - Callas / J. Edgar Hoover
 Crime Story (1986) - Noah Ganz
 The Equalizer (1987) - Antonio
 CBS Summer Playhouse (The Saint in Manhattan) (1987) - Carmine
 True Blue (1990)
 Who's the Boss? (1991) - Gus Stone
 Murphy Brown (1991) - Super
 Matlock (1992) - Jay Cutler
 Nurses (1992) - Officer Torres
 Knots Landing (1993) - Deputy
 Reasonable Doubts (1993) - Eddie Novak
 The Young Indiana Jones Chronicles (1993) - Colosimo
 Murder, She Wrote (1993) - Ben Eigers
 The Job (2001) - Man in Store

References

External links
 

1936 births
2003 deaths
American male film actors
American male television actors
American people of Italian descent
Male actors from New York (state)
20th-century American male actors